The Oklahoma City Open was a golf tournament on the LPGA Tour, played only in 1955. It was played at Lincoln Park Golf Course in Oklahoma City, Oklahoma. Louise Suggs won the event.

References

Former LPGA Tour events
Golf in Oklahoma
Sports in Oklahoma City
Women's sports in Oklahoma